Guayabal is a corregimiento in Boquerón District, Chiriquí Province, Panama. Its population as of 1990 was 1,543; its population as of 2000 was 1,797.

References

Corregimientos of Chiriquí Province